Beaver Dam Pond is a  pond in the Manomet section of Plymouth, Massachusetts. The pond is located north of Little Island Pond, west of Fresh Pond, and east of the Pine Hills. The pond is the headwaters of Beaver Dam Brook. The water quality may be impaired due to discharge from developments in the watershed. Non-native plants in the watershed are being managed by the owners.

External links
Environmental Protection Agency
South Shore Coastal Watersheds - Lake Assessments

this pond is the water source to manomets largest cranberry bog

Ponds of Plymouth, Massachusetts
Ponds of Massachusetts